Shahr-e Sukhteh (meaning "[The] Burnt City"), c. 3200–2350 BC,
also spelled as Shahr-e Sūkhté and Shahr-i Sōkhta, is an archaeological site of a sizable Bronze Age urban settlement, associated with the Helmand culture. It is located in Sistan and Baluchistan Province, the southeastern part of Iran, on the bank of the Helmand River, near the Zahedan-Zabol road. It was placed on the UNESCO World Heritage List in June 2014.

The reasons for the unexpected rise and fall of the city are still wrapped in mystery. Artifacts recovered from the city demonstrate a peculiar incongruity with nearby civilizations of the time and it has been speculated that Shahr-e Sukhteh might ultimately provide concrete evidence of a civilization east of prehistoric Persia that was independent of ancient Mesopotamia.

Archaeology 
Covering an area of 151 hectares, Shahr-e Sukhteh was one of the world's largest cities at the dawn of the urban era. It is located close to the eastern edge of what is now Lut desert, one of the hottest places on Earth. The climate was far more welcoming in ancient times when the Hamun Lake, near which the city was located, was much greater in size, and there was a lot of marshland in the area. Also, Dahan-e Gholaman (550 BC–330 BC), a major Achaemenid center and archaeological site is located only 35 km to the northeast.

In the southwestern part of Shahr-e Sukhteh, there is a vast graveyard, measuring 25 ha. It contains between 25,000 and 40,000 ancient graves.

The settlement appeared around 3200 BC. The city had four stages of civilization and was burnt down three times before being abandoned around 2350 BC. This abandonment was thought previously to have taken place around 1800 BC by the Italian archaeological mission there, but new research, based on recently calibrated radiocarbon samples in nearby site Tappeh Graziani, by a new mission of Italian and Iranian archaeologists, led by Barbara Helwing and Hassan Fazeli Nashli, showed that the site was abandoned around 2350 BC, and the chronology of Shahr-i Sokhta commented by archaeologist Massimo Vidale is as follows:

The site was discovered and investigated by Aurel Stein in the early 1900s.

Beginning in 1967, the site was excavated by the Istituto italiano per l'Africa e l'Oriente (IsIAO) team led by Maurizio Tosi. That work continued until 1978. After a gap, work at the site was resumed by the Iranian Cultural Heritage and Tourism Organization team led by SMS Sajjadi. New discoveries are reported from time to time.

Most of the material discovered is dated to the period of c. 2700-2350 BC. The discoveries indicate that the city was a hub of trading routes that connected Mesopotamia and Iran with the Indus civilizations.

Period I 
During Period I, Shahr-e Sukhteh already shows close connections with the sites in southern Turkmenistan, with the Kandahar region of Afghanistan, the Quetta valley, and the Bampur valley in Iran. Also, there are connections with the Proto-Elamite cities of Ḵuzestān and Fārs. Around 3000 BC, potters in Shahr-i Sokhta reproduced ceramic styles from distant Turkmenistan, located 750 km to the north, and other ceramics were imported from the Pakistani Kech-Makran—Iranian Balochistan area, located around 400-500 km to the south, and ceramics from the Mundigak (Kandahar) region in Afghanistan, around 400 km to the east, were also imported. Recent excavations by Enrico Ascalone, in Area 33 of Shahr-i Sokhta, show that the so-called "House of the Architect" and the Eastern Building belong to a layer radiocarbon-dated from 3000 to 2850 BC.

Pottery during this period, in phases 10, 9, and 8, typically exhibits light paste colors for the body and rich decorations very similar to those found on ceramics from Mundigak III and Quetta ware from Baluchistan.

Period II 
During Period II, Shahr-e Sukhteh was also in contact with the pre-Harappan centers of the Indus valley, and the contacts with the Bampur valley continued. The ruins of the building called "House of the Courts" was radiocarbon-dated by archaeologist Ascalone to 2850-2620 BC, and the next layer 2 was considered by him as a "squatter occupation" in Area 33, which he radiocarbon-dated to 2620-2600 BC. But, as per archaeologist Sajjadi, the whole site of Shahr-i Sokhta reached in this period almost 80 hectares. It seems likely that contacts with Mundigak were close in this Period and that lapis lazuli arrived in Shahr-i Sokhta from mines of Badakshan moving through Mundigak, and the relations of both settlements made possible to scholars to speak of a Helmand Civilization. Around 2700 BC, at the end of Phase 7, most of the city was destroyed by a fire, particularly the Eastern Residential Area and the Central Quarters showed "rooms with burnt plaster, filled with ash and burnt remains of roof beams." But during Phase 6 of this Period, the settlement was reconstructed, although some houses which were destroyed were not rebuilt.

This Period, in phases 7, 6, and 5, represented a time of significant development in both the size of the city and ceramic technology, as finer raw materials and advanced firing techniques used during this period resulted in ceramics with denser body-paste and pottery that was similar to those found in Bampur III-IV, but most of the ceramics that were produced and/or imported during this period were buff and gray wares with brown and black decorations.

Period III 

 
In Phases 4, 3, and 2 of Period III, there was a change in the city with large buildings constructed with massive encircling walls. The pottery lost the painted ornamentation of Period II and became standardized, and burials showed socio-economic differences among the population. The goods previously imported from Mesopotamia and western Iran disappear at the end of Phase 4, but the contacts and trade with Mundigak, Bampur and the cities of Indus civilization continue. The "Building 33" also belonging to Area 33 of Shahr-i Sokhta (located between the Central Quarters and the Monumental Area) was radiocarbon-dated by the team of Enrico Ascalone to 2600-2450 BC.

On the other hand, archaeologists Jarrige, Didier, and Quivron considered that Periods I, II, and III in Shahr-i Sokhta have archaeological links with Periods III and IV in Mundigak.

Pottery production during Period III, in Phases 4 and 3, had forms and depicted motifs that differed significantly from those featured by ceramics of the former periods, and at the beginning of this period, simple decorative motifs originally found on ceramics became more elaborated and gray-paste pottery with black decoration, similar to those found during Bampur IV and Tepe Yahya IV, became more present, and small undecorated bowls with thin bodies also appeared at the end of this period.

Abundant polychrome ceramics were found in graveyards, apparently used in religious rituals, and similar pottery was found at Nal in Baluchistan, Pakistan, and based on this fact some scholars concluded that polychrome ceramics in Shahr-i Sokhta were imported, but others such as Mugavero (2008) suggested that this pottery is local, as production of this type can be found at Shahr-i Sokhta's nearby sites of Tepe Dash and Tepe Rud-e Biyaban, located 3 km and 30 km south of Shahr-i Sokhta respectively.

Period IV 

Period IV was known by excavations in the "Burnt Palace" or "Burnt Building", and archaeologists consider that during this Period Shahr-i Sokhta had contacts with Bampur valley and Kandahar area almost exclusively, this is attested in typical Bampur V and VI pottery. Processing workshops were discovered in 1972 in the western quarters of the city with large concentrations of flint, lapis lazuli and turquoise, these sites are considered unique in the region. On the other hand, Enrico Ascalone, in his recent excavations, discovered a phase of abandonment in Area 33 of Shahr-i Sokhta, radiocarbon-dated to 2450-2350 BC. This phase, however, was considered recently by archaeologist Massimo Vidale as the last period of profusely developed urban occupation for the whole settlement of Shahr-i Sokhta.

Iranian archaeologists S.M.S. Sajjadi and Hossein Moradi, during excavation season (2014-2015), found a system of semi-columns in a long passage between two buildings in area 26 of Shahr-i Sokhta's Period IV, and Massimo Vidale considers it is part of a "fully palatial" compound with very similar semi-columns to those in Mehrgarh found years ago by the French mission that dated them around 2500 BC.

On the other hand, Ascalone, in his lecture admits in a chronological graphic, that after a period of abandonment between 2350 and 2200 BC the "Burnt Building" in Shahr-i Sokhta was inhabited from 2200 to 2000 BC, based on calibrated radiocarbon datings presented by archaeologist Raffaele Biscione in 1979, but this can be a unique survival of previous urban occupation, as Massimo Vidale comments that the "urban system" did not go beyond 2350 BC. M. Tosi and R. Biscione who excavated many years ago this "Burnt Building" considered it was "destroyed in a ruinous firing" around 2000 BC.

Sectors of the city 

The area of Shahr-e Sukhteh is divided into five main sectors, as mentioned by archaeologist S.M.S. Sajjadi:
 
1. The Eastern Residential Area, located in the highest point of the site. Some pottery belonging to Period I was found in excavations within this Eastern Residential Area to the north of the Burnt Building.
 
2. The Great Central Area, or Central Quarters, separated from the western, southern and eastern areas by deep depressions. Within these Central Quarters there is a place known as "House of the Jars", where among other pottery a Kot Dijian jar was found. 
 
3. The Craftsman Quarters, found in the north-western part of the site.
 
4. The Monumental Area, located east of the Craftsman Quarters with several high hills representing different architectural buildings. Some pottery kilns were found in the north- western part of the site near and around he Monumental Area, but most vessels were produced out of the town.
 
5. The Graveyard Area, also called the Cemetery of Shahr-i Sokhta, which occupies the southwestern part of the site covering almost 25 ha. The estimated number of graves ranges between 25,000 and 40,000, and most of the burials are dated to Period I and Period II, although some other few burials are from next two periods.

Finds 

An earthen goblet found at the site and dated to c. 3178 BC depicts what some archaeologists consider to be the earliest known animation and the date places the artifact in Period I, the earliest period in the development and flourishing of the Shahr-e Sookhteh culture.  
The earliest known artificial eyeball was discovered in the burial of a women at the site by archaeologists in December 2006. It has a hemispherical form and a diameter of just more than 2.5 cm (1 inch). It consists of very light material, probably bitumen paste. The surface of the artificial eye is covered with a thin layer of gold, engraved with a central circle (representing the iris) and gold lines patterned like sun rays. The woman whose remains were found with the artificial eye was 1.82 m tall (6 feet), much taller than typical women of her time. Tiny holes are drilled on both sides of the eye, through which a golden thread would have been drawn in order to hold the eyeball in place. Since microscopic research has shown that the eye socket showed clear imprints of the golden thread, the eyeball must have been worn throughout her lifetime. The woman's skeleton has been dated to between 2900 and 2800 BC.
The oldest known tables game with dice and 60 playing pieces, as well as caraway seeds, together with numerous metallurgical finds (e.g. slag and crucible pieces), are among the finds which have been unearthed by archaeological excavations from this site.
A human skull found at the site indicates the practice of brain surgery. 
A unique marble cup was found at the site on 29 December 2014.
 A Bronze Age piece of leather adorned with drawings was discovered at the site in January 2015.

Public health finding 
Paleoparasitological studies suggest that ancient inhabitants living in the excavated areas were infected by nematodes of the genus Physaloptera, a rare parasite incidence.

Relationship to other early cultures 
The Shahr-i Sokhta civilization flourished between 3200 and 2350 BC, and may have coincided with first phase of the great flourishing Indus Valley civilization. Periods III and IV of Shahr-i Sokhta, and the last part of Mundigak Period IV are contemporary to Mature Harappan 3A and part of Mature Harappan 3B. 

The Helmand and Jiroft cultures are closely related as well. The Helmand culture of western Afghanistan was a Bronze Age culture of the 3rd millennium BC. Scholars link it with the Shahr-i Sokhta, Mundigak, and Bampur sites. The Jiroft culture flourished in the eastern Iran, and the Helmand culture in western Afghanistan at the same time. In fact, they may represent the same cultural area. 

Shahdad is another extensive site that is being excavated and is related. Some 900 Bronze Age sites have been documented in the Sistan Basin, the desert area between Afghanistan and Pakistan.

On the other hand, the Mehrgarh culture flourished far earlier.

See also 
Sistan Basin
Cities of the Ancient Near East
Mundigak

References

Further reading 
F. H. Andrewa, Painted Neolithic Pottery in Sistan discovered by Sir Aurel Stein, The Burlington Magazine, vol. 47, pp. 304–308, 1925

External links 

 Elamite clay tablet unearthed in mysterious Burnt City - Tehran Times - December 24, 2021
 Shahr-e Sukhteh, CHN
 Burnt City Inhabitants Used Teeth for Basket Weaving, CHN
 World's Oldest Backgammon Set found at the Burnt City

History of Sistan and Baluchestan Province
Helmand culture
Archaeological sites in Iran
Architecture in Iran
Ancient Iranian cities
Former populated places in Iran
Buildings and structures in Sistan and Baluchestan Province
Persian words and phrases
World Heritage Sites in Iran
Tourist attractions in Sistan and Baluchestan Province
Jiroft culture
Populated places established in the 4th millennium BC